Becque is a French spelling of the Old West Flemish word beke, Dutch Beek, meaning 'beck': small water stream, smaller than a river. A number of small rivers flowing in Nord département (northern France) and Belgium are called Becque(s) or Becq.

Rivers called Becque include:

 Becque d'Hardelot
 Becque de Méteren
 Becque de Steenwerck, a tributary of the Scheldt
 Becque du Biez, a tributary of the Lys
 Becque du Doulieu  
 Ey Becque, a tributary of the Yser
 Peene Becque, a tributary of the Yser
 Sale Becque, a tributary of the Yser
 Zwyne Becque, a tributary of the Yser

Becq, a word with the same meaning for a stream, may be found in:

 Esquelbecq, a village in Nord département, France
 Robecq, a village in Nord département, France

See also 
Germanic toponymy
Becq (disambiguation)
Becque (disambiguation)
Bec (disambiguation)
 Beek (disambiguation)

Rivers of Europe